Jean Olry is a French retired slalom canoeist who competed from the late 1950s to the mid-1960s. He won two medals in the mixed C-2 team event at the ICF Canoe Slalom World Championships with a silver in 1957 and a bronze in 1965.

References

French male canoeists
Possibly living people
Year of birth missing (living people)
Medalists at the ICF Canoe Slalom World Championships